Lake Munmorah or Munmorah Lake, a lagoon that is part of the Tuggerah Lakes, is located within the  local government area in the Central Coast region of New South Wales, Australia.

Features and location
A quaint little village nestled on the banks of a lake with the same name, where people enjoy watersports of all types in the crystal clear waters. Lake Munmorah is located north of Budgewoi and is bounded by Wyee, Mannering Park and Wyee Bay. To the south of the lake, the Budgewoi Lake and Tuggerah Lake drains excess water, that flows to the Tasman Sea of the South Pacific Ocean, via The Entrance.

National Park of Munmorah
Lake Munmorah has an NPWS owned National Park north east of Munmorah. It hosts beaches, lookouts, picnic areas, hiking trails and more.

History 

In October 2013 the area was threatened by bushfires. Evacuations were carried out to Doyalson and Swansea RSL's (Returned Services League) and Gwandalan Bowling Club. Power lines were  brought down affecting over 600 homes.  Munmorah State Conservation Area had large areas burnt out. One man died while trying to protect his heritage listed home.

See also

 Munmorah State Conservation Area
 List of lakes of Australia

References

External links
 

Munmorah
Central Coast (New South Wales)
Important Bird Areas of New South Wales